Enamorada may refer to:

Film and TV
 Enamorada (film), a 1946 Mexican drama film
 Enamorada (1986 TV series), a 1986 Venezuelan telenovela
 Enamorada (1999 TV series), a 1999 Venezuelan telenovela

Music
 Enamorada (Lucía Méndez album), 1983
 Enamorada (Yuri album), 2002
 Enamorada, a 1998 album by María Félix
 Enamorada, a 1996 album by Zayda y Su Grupo
 "Enamorada", standard song written by Consuelo Velázquez
 "Enamorada", composed Agustín Lara, sung by Tony Pizarro 
 "Enamorada", composed Augusto Algueró, sung by Lucho Gatica
 "Enamorada", a song by Paulina Rubio from Planeta Paulina